The Divisiones Regionales de Fútbol in the Community of Navarre:
Primera Autonómica (Level 6 of the Spanish football pyramid)
Preferente de Navarra (Level 7)
Primera Regional de Navarra (Level 8)

League chronology
Timeline

Primera Autonómica

The Primera Autonómica de Navarra is the sixth level of competition in the Spanish League Football in the Community of Navarre.

2022–23 teams

Group 1

Aoiz
Baztan
Bidezarra
Corellano
Erriberri
Infanzones
Injerto
Idoya
Lourdes
Murchante
Peña Azagresa
San Miguel

Group 2

At. Artajonés
At. Valtierrano
Beti Kozkor
Gares 
Iruña
Lerinés
Mendi
Mutilvera B
River Ega
San Adrián
Zarramonza

Champions

Regional Preferente
 
The Regional Preferente de Navarra is the seventh level of competition in the Spanish League Football in the Community of Navarre.

Primera Regional
 
The Primera Regional is the eighth level of competition in the Spanish League Football in the Community of Navarre.

External links
Federación Navarra de Fútbol
Futbolme.com

Football in Navarre
Divisiones Regionales de Fútbol